Thomas Frischknecht (born 17 February 1970 in Feldbach, Switzerland) is a former Swiss mountain bike and cyclo-cross racer, often called Europe's Elder Statesman of mountain biking, because of his extraordinarily long career at the top level of the sport. A professional since 1990, he was on top of the Mountain Bike World Championship podium for the first time in 1996 and most recently in 2004.

Biography
Frischi (as he is called) advocates staying 'fit for life' and dope free racing. He is considered an excellent example of a clean sportsman.

In 1996 he was second at the World Cross-country Mountain Bike Championships, but after France's Jérôme Chiotti confessed having used EPO when he won the title that year, he got the rainbow jersey from Chiotti, handed over as a friendly act in an unofficial ceremony.

He won the Olympic silver medal in 1996. The next day he competed in the men's road race on a Ritchey cyclocross bike after fellow Swiss team member Tony Rominger fell ill. He finished the race in the middle of the pack.

Frischknecht also competes in cyclo-cross, where he won an Amateur World Champion title, was Vice World Champion in 1997 and is a multiple-time Swiss Champion.

Thomas first traveled to America in 1990 to compete in the then new genre of mountain biking. He became closely linked to Tom Ritchey, a major bike-components producer, who provided support and became a mentor and a good friend. Ritchey has sponsored him ever since. Other major sponsors include Swisspower, an electric utility consortium, and Scott bicycles.

Frischknecht was author of a book on mountain biking, Richtig Mountainbiken. He is currently involved with the Frischi Bike School in the Engadin/St. Moritz area of Switzerland.

Victories

1988

 World Championship, Cyclo-cross, Juniors, Hagendorf
1989

 Roma, Cyclo-cross (ITA)
1990

 Schulteiss-Cup, Cyclo-cross (GER)
1991

 National Championship, Cyclo-cross, Elite, Switzerland (SUI)
 Overijse, Cyclo-cross (BEL)
 Schulteiss-Cup, Cyclo-cross (GER)
 Wetzikon, Cyclo-cross (SUI)
 World Championship, Cyclo-cross, Amateurs, Gieten
1992

 Dagmersellen, Cyclo-cross (SUI)
 Mont Sainte-Anne, Mountainbike (CAN)
 Roma, Cyclo-cross (ITA)
 Schulteiss-Cup, Cyclo-cross (GER)
 Landgraaf, Mountainbike (NED)
 Strathpeffer, Mountainbike (GBR)
 Mount Snow, Mountainbike (USA)
1993

 European Championship, Mountainbike, Elite
 Schulteiss-Cup, Cyclo-cross (GER)
 Wetzikon, Cyclo-cross (SUI)
1994

 Dagmersellen, Cyclo-cross (SUI)
 Mont Sainte-Anne, Mountainbike (CAN)
1995

 Vail, Mountainbike (USA)
 Mammoth Lakes, Mountainbike (USA)
1996

 World Championship, Mountainbike XC Elite, Cairns
 Sankt-Wendel, Mountainbike (GER)
 Gansingen, Cyclo-cross (SUI)
1997

 National Championship, Cyclo-cross, Elite, Switzerland, Liestal (SUI)
 Sankt-Wendel, Mountainbike (GER)
1998

 Budapest, Mountainbike (HUN)
 Hombrechtikon, Cyclo-cross (SUI)
1999

 Meilen, Cyclo-cross (SUI)
 Zeddam, Cyclo-cross (NED)
 Magstadt, Cyclo-cross (GER)
 National Championship, Cyclo-cross, Elite, Switzerland, Eschenbach (SUI)
 Canmore, Mountainbike (CAN)
 Liestal, Cyclo-cross (SUI)
 Obergögsen, Cyclo-cross (SUI)
2001

 Safenwil, Cyclo-cross (SUI)
 Magstadt, Cyclo-cross (GER)
 Kaprun, Mountainbike (AUT)
 Castelnuovo, Cyclo-cross (ITA)
 Dagmersellen, Cyclo-cross (SUI)
2002

 Dagmersellen, Cyclo-cross (SUI)
 National Championship, Cyclo-cross, Elite, Switzerland (SUI)
 Hittnau, Cyclo-cross (SUI)
 San Mateo, Cyclo-cross (USA)
 Hombrechtikon, Cyclo-cross (SUI)
2003

 World Championship, Mountainbike Marathon
 Russikon, Cyclo-cross (SUI)
2004

 San Mateo, Cyclo-cross (b) (USA)
 San Mateo, Cyclo-cross (USA)
2005

 World Championship, Mountainbike Marathon, Lillehammer (NOR)
 Magstadt, Cyclo-cross (GER)
2017

 Absa Cape Epic Mixed category (RSA)

References

External links
 Thomas Frischknecht’s home page
 Swisspower Mountainbike Team
Frischi Bike School
 Mountain Bike Hall of Fame

1970 births
Living people
People from Meilen District
Swiss male cyclists
Olympic cyclists of Switzerland
Cyclists at the 1996 Summer Olympics
Cyclists at the 2000 Summer Olympics
Cyclists at the 2004 Summer Olympics
Cyclo-cross cyclists
Cross-country mountain bikers
Marathon mountain bikers
Olympic medalists in cycling
UCI Mountain Bike World Champions (men)
Medalists at the 1996 Summer Olympics
Olympic silver medalists for Switzerland
Swiss mountain bikers
Sportspeople from the canton of Zürich
20th-century Swiss people
21st-century Swiss people